Ilewi is a small village in Imiekuri, Okpella, Nigeria in Estako east local government area, the village is known for their palm and bamboo trees and trade, and is the birthplace of  Unhokhasor Olowu the late and old king of Imiekuri.

Geography of Nigeria